The Lottery River is a river of the north Canterbury region of New Zealand's South Island.

See also
List of rivers of New Zealand

References

Rivers of Canterbury, New Zealand
Rivers of New Zealand